Pikwik Pack is a Canadian animated children's television series. It was created by Mary Bredin, Frank Falcone and Rachel Reade Marcus, and produced by Corus Entertainment and Guru Studio. The series premiered on Disney Junior in the United States on November 7, 2020, and on Treehouse TV in Canada on December 26, 2020.

Premise 
Pikwik Pack centers around a group of four animals: Suki the hedgehog, Axel the raccoon, Hazel the cat and Tibor the hippo. The plot device for each episode revolves around a new package arriving at the Pikwik post office, which the quartet must deliver to a local resident in time, avoiding various obstacles. The package is tagged with three diamonds; a red one which notes its recipient, a yellow diamond which gives the package's intended delivery location, and the blue diamond indicating the delivery deadline and special handling needs.

Characters

Main 
 Suki (voiced by Emma Ho), an anthropomorphic sea green hedgehog who is the leader of the Pikwik Pack. She is responsible, thoughtful, and always supports her team. Suki's vehicle is a boat.
 Axel (voiced by Daniel Pathan), an anthropomorphic blue raccoon. He is funny, fearless, and likes going fast. Axel's vehicle is a truck.
 Hazel (voiced by Molly Lewis), a silly and adventurous anthropomorphic orange cat. Her favorite food is tacos. Hazel's vehicle is a helicopter.
 Tibor (voiced by Jacob Soley), an anthropomorphic purple hippo. He is strong, reliable and loves to keep things on track. Tibor's vehicle is a train.

Secondary 

 Captain Kate (voiced by Deann DeGruijter)
 Grandpa Grok (voiced by Brad Adamson)
 Edgar (voiced by Taylor Puterman)
 Cosmo (voiced by Ian Ho)
 William (voiced by Glee Dango)
 Farmer Frances (voiced by Cory Doran)
 Croc (voiced by Brad Adamson)
 Chipper (voiced by Markeda McKay)
 Tila (voiced by Glee Dango)
 Willow (voiced by Taylor Puterman)
 Beverly Beaver (voiced by Stacey DePass)
 Professor Hoot (voiced by Ron Rubin)
 Hugo (voiced by Ron Rubin)
 Paulina (voiced by Shoshana Sperling)
 Wally (voiced by Brad Adamson)
 Markieff Moose (voiced by Rob Tinkler)
 Laurence O’Llama (voiced by Rob Tinkler)
 Oscar (voiced by Ian Ho)
 Rosco (voiced by Juan Chioran)
 Maddy Rhino (voiced by Michela Luci)
 Brando Beaver (voiced by Christian Potenza)
 Allie Armadillo (voiced by Shoshana Sperling)
 Polly Polar Bear (voiced by Zarina Rocha)
 Petra Penguin (voiced by Zarina Rocha)
 Percy Penguin (voiced by Ian Ho)
 Peter Polar Bear (voiced by Rob Tinkler)
 Patrick Polar Bear (voiced by Rob Tinkler)
 Bison Bros (voiced by Christian Potenza)
 Mama Polar Bear (voiced by Julie Lemieux)
 Henrietta Hare (voiced by Maya Misaljevic)
 Winston (voiced by Callum Shoniker)
 Loni (voiced by Davide Fair)
 Papa Wolf (voiced by Joshua Graham)
 Benjamin Beaver (voiced by Rob Tinkler)
 Billy Beaver (voiced by Rob Tinkler)
 Bobby Beaver (voiced by Rob Tinkler)
 Benny (voiced by Ron Rubin)
 Squick (voiced by Linda Ballantyne)
 Squack (voiced by Samantha Swan)
 JJ Giraffe (voiced by Roman Pesino)
 Calvin (voiced by Brad Adamson)
 Rafi (voiced by Christian Potenza)
 Basil (voiced by Rob Tinkler)
 Dougie Duck (voiced by Rob Tinkler)

Episodes

Other media

Books 
On October 8, 2019, Scholastic have link it rights to master publishing partner for Pikwik Pack books.

Merchandise 
Playmates Toys was named as the global toy partner for Pikwik Pack in January 2019; the company announced that toys would be released around the world excluding China.

Broadcast

Original 
Pikwik Pack first premiered on Disney Junior in United States on November 7, 2020. In Canada, it began airing on Treehouse TV since December 26, 2020, and on Disney Junior since January 14, 2022; it is also airing on Télétoon and La Chaîne Disney in French-speaking Canada. Since September 1, 2021, the series airs on Tiny Pop in the United Kingdom. In Singapore, the series airs on Channel 5 since November 3, 2021, as a part of the Okto on 5 programming block.

The series was also added to Hulu on May 4, 2021, and includes a secondary Spanish dub. In Canada, it is available on Amazon Prime Video, as a part of the StackTV package.

International 
Pikwik Pack has also been distributed to countries around the world. The series is currently airing on MiniMini+ in Poland, Canal Panda in Portugal and Spain, Yle TV2 in Finland, Rai Yoyo in Italy, Gloobinho in Brazil, Hop! Channel in Israel, TG4 in Ireland, EBC Yoyo in Taiwan, Carousel, O! and Shayan TV in Russia, Super RTL in Germany, and KidZone Mini in the Baltic states. The series is also available on Youku, Tencent Video, and Mango TV in China, and on Blim TV in Mexico. The series also aired on Disney Junior in South Korea on April 7, 2021, until its closure.

Notes

References

External links 
 on Disney Junior
 

2020 Canadian television series debuts
2020s Canadian children's television series
2020s Canadian animated television series
Canadian children's animated adventure television series
Canadian children's animated comedy television series
Canadian children's animated fantasy television series
Canadian preschool education television series
Animated preschool education television series
2020s preschool education television series
Canadian flash animated television series
Disney Junior original programming
English-language television shows
Animated television series about cats
Animated television series about hedgehogs
Television series about raccoons